Holy Trinity Parish - designated for Polish immigrants in Hatfield, Massachusetts, United States.

 Founded 1916. It is one of the Polish-American Roman Catholic parishes in New England in the Diocese of Springfield in Massachusetts.

The parish was closed at the end of 2009.

Bibliography 
 
 

 The Official Catholic Directory in USA

External links 
 Holy Trinity - Diocesan information
 Holy Trinity - ParishesOnline.com
 Holy Trinity - TheCatholicDirectory.com 
 Diocese of Springfield in Massachusetts

See also 
 

Roman Catholic parishes of Diocese of Springfield in Massachusetts
Polish-American Roman Catholic parishes in Massachusetts
Churches in Hampshire County, Massachusetts